Luciano Faraguti (26 August 1937 – 11 March 2018) was an Italian politician.

He was born in La Spezia on 26 August 1937. Faraguti was a member of the regional council of Liguria from 1975 to 1979. He then served in the Chamber of Deputies until 1994. Between 1983 and 1987, he served as undersecretary of tourism. Faraguti died at a hospital in Genoa on 11 March 2018.

References

1937 births
2018 deaths
People from La Spezia
Christian Democracy (Italy) politicians
Italian People's Party (1994) politicians
Deputies of Legislature VIII of Italy
Deputies of Legislature IX of Italy
Deputies of Legislature X of Italy
Deputies of Legislature XI of Italy
Politicians of Liguria